Archibald Paton Thornton (1921 – 19 February 2004) was an academic and historian. He was the author of the seminal history of the British Empire, The Imperial idea and its enemies: a study in British power (St. Martin's Press, 1959).  He was professor of history at University College, University of Toronto.

Born in Glasgow, Scotland, he attended Kelvinside Academy from 1929 to 1939.  During the Second World War, he served in the British Army, attaining the rank of captain in the East Riding Imperial Yorkshire Yeomanry. He attended the University of Glasgow, where he received a Master of Arts degree in 1947. He received a D.Phil. from Trinity College, Oxford in 1952. After the war, he was a lecturer in modern history at Trinity College, Oxford from 1948 to 1950. From 1950 to 1957, he was a lecturer in Imperial history at the University of Aberdeen. From 1957 to 1960, he was a professor and chairman of history and dean of arts at the University College of West Indies. In 1960, he was made a professor of history at the University of Toronto and was chairman of the department from 1967 to 1972.  He was attached to University College at the University of Toronto and retired in 1987.

He was the author of West-India Policy under the Restoration (1956), The Imperial Idea and its Enemies (1959), Doctrines of Imperialism (1965), The Habit of Authority (1966), For the File on Empire (1968), and Imperialism in the 20th Century (1978).

He was a Fellow of the Royal Society of Canada.

References
 Canadian Who's Who 1997 entry
 Oxford University Gazette, 23 June 2006: Colleges, Halls, and Societies

External links 

 A. P. Thornton archival papers held at the University of Toronto Archives and Records Management Services

1921 births
2004 deaths
Academics of the University of Aberdeen
Alumni of the University of Glasgow
Alumni of Trinity College, Oxford
British Army personnel of World War II
Canadian male non-fiction writers
Canadian Presbyterians
Fellows of the Royal Society of Canada
Fellows of Trinity College, Oxford
Writers from Glasgow
Academic staff of the University of Toronto
University of the West Indies academics
20th-century Canadian historians
British expatriates in Jamaica
British emigrants to Canada